Union Township is one of thirteen townships in Tippecanoe County, Indiana, United States. As of the 2010 census, its population was 1,610 and it contained 675 housing units.

Geography
The township and the town of Shadeland share the same borders.

Cities, towns, villages
 Lafayette (along northeast boundary)
 Shadeland

Adjacent townships
 Wabash Township (north)
 Fairfield Township (northeast)
 Wea Township (east)
 Randolph Township (southeast)
 Jackson Township (southwest)
 Wayne Township (west)

Cemeteries
The township contains these three cemeteries: Durkee, Farmers Institute and Hickory Grove.

Major highways
  Indiana State Road 25

School districts
 Tippecanoe School Corporation

Political districts
 Indiana's 4th congressional district
 State House District 26
 State Senate District 22

References
 United States Census Bureau 2007 TIGER/Line Shapefiles
 United States Board on Geographic Names (GNIS)
 United States National Atlas

External links
 Indiana Township Association
 United Township Association of Indiana

Townships in Tippecanoe County, Indiana
Lafayette metropolitan area, Indiana
Townships in Indiana